Thomas Benedict, Sr. (1617 – February 28, 1689) was an early settler in colonial New York, and Connecticut. He was a member of the General Court of the Colony of Connecticut from Norwalk in the sessions of May 1670, and May 1675.

References 

1617 births
1689 deaths
American weavers
Burials in East Norwalk Historical Cemetery
City and town clerks
Connecticut city council members
Deputies of the Connecticut General Assembly (1662–1698)
English emigrants
Members of the New York Provincial Assembly
New York (state) city council members
People of the Province of New York
People from Jamaica, Queens
Politicians from Norwalk, Connecticut
People from Nottingham
Settlers of Connecticut